

The Lloyd 40.05 (a.k.a. Type FJ - Flugzeug Jäger - aircraft hunter) was a very unorthodox experimental fighter/reconnaissance biplane produced by Lloyd (Ungarische Lloyd Flugzeug und Motorenfabrik AG / Magyar Lloyd Repülőgép és motorgyár Részvény-Társaság) in the Austro-Hungarian Empire during the First World War.

Specifications (Lloyd 40.05)

References

External links
 World War One Aviation: Austrian Experimental Aircraft
Military aircraft of World War I 
1910s Austro-Hungarian military reconnaissance aircraft
Single-engined tractor aircraft
Biplanes
Aircraft first flown in 1916